in Abashiri, Hokkaidō, Japan, was an Ainu chashi, or a fortified settlement. Occupying an elevated site overlooking the Sea of Okhotsk, the natural changes in elevation of the two mounds upon the plateau were ideal for a fortification. The defensive capability was augmented by the addition of moats.

It is now a historical site open to the public and has been designated a national Historic Site.

See also

 List of Historic Sites of Japan (Hokkaidō)
 List of Cultural Properties of Japan - archaeological materials (Hokkaidō)
 Abashiri City Folk Museum
 Yukuepira Chashi

References

Castles in Hokkaido
Abashiri, Hokkaido
Archaeological sites in Japan
Chashi